The Snana Yatra, also spelt Snana Jatra, is a bathing festival of deities celebrated on the purnima (full moon day) of the Hindu month of Jyeshtha. It is the auspicious birthday of Jagannath. 

It is an important festival for Hindus. This is the first occasion in the year as per the Hindu calendar, when the deities Jagannath, Balabhadra, Subhadra, Sudarshana, and Madanmohana are brought out from the Jagannath Temple (Puri) and taken in a procession to the Snana Bedi. There they are ceremonially bathed and decorated for a public audience with the devotees.

Religious significance 
It is a belief among devotees of Lord Jagannath that if they make a pilgrimage to see the deity on this day, they would be cleansed of all of their sins. Hundreds of thousands of devotees visit the temple on the occasion. The Skanda Purana mentions that King Indradyumna arranged this ceremony for the first time when the idols of the deities were first installed.

Ceremonies conducted 
On the eve of the Snana Yatra (which means the Divine Bathing festival, in Sanskrit), the idols of the deities are brought out in a grand procession from the garbhagriha (sanctum sanctorum) to the Snana Bedi (bathing platform). Devotees come to view the deities.

On the day of the Snana Yatra, the deities are bathed with 108 pots, of ritually purified water drawn from the northern well of the temple to the accompaniment of religious incantations.
In the evening, at the conclusion of the bathing ritual, Jagannath and Balabhadra are dressed up in elephant headgear representing the God Ganesh. This form of the God is called the 'Gajavesha'.

After the Snana Yatra the Gods are traditionally believed to fall ill and are kept in a sick room to recuperate in privacy under the care of the Raj Vaidya. During this period known as Anasara the Gods cannot be seen by devotees. At this time three pata chitra paintings are displayed for devotees to view instead
It is said that with the Ayurvedic medication ('') administered by the Raj Vaidya the Gods recover in a fortnight and resume giving an audience to their devotees.

During the Anasara period devotees head to the Alarnatha Mandira in Bramhagiri in the belief that Jagannath manifests as Alarnatha during this period

References 

Festivals in Jagannath
Festivals in Odisha
Hindu festivals
Religious festivals in India